Kabru is a supercomputer that uses a 2.4 GHz Pentium Xeon Cluster and Linux to provide a sustained speed of 959 gigaflops. It was developed by the Institute of Mathematical Sciences (IMSc) in  Chennai, India. In June 2004, Kabru was listed as #264 in the TOP500 list of the world's most powerful computers. It takes its name from a Himalayan peak.

The idea for Kabru was born when Professor Hari Dass of the Institute began looking for a supercomputer to handle his theoretical physics research, which dealt primarily with large-scale simulations in the field of the lattice gauge theory.

The Department of Atomic Energy in India made a grant of Rs 3.5 crore to the Institute to develop Kabru.

References
 https://web.archive.org/web/20071111162356/http://www.expresscomputeronline.com/20040816/coverstory01.shtml
 http://www.rediff.com/computer/jul/08c-dac.htm

X86 supercomputers